Hoskins Mill is a historic cotton mill located at Charlotte, Mecklenburg County, North Carolina. It was built in 1903–1904, and is a rectangular brick building consisting of a three-story, main section with a one-story weaving room addition. The floor of the mill was used for weaving, the second for carding, and the third for spinning.  Also on the property is a 1 1/2-story, rectangular brick office building.  It was used as a mill through 1985.

It was added to the National Register of Historic Places in 1988.

References

Cotton mills in the United States
Industrial buildings and structures on the National Register of Historic Places in North Carolina
Industrial buildings completed in 1904
Buildings and structures in Charlotte, North Carolina
National Register of Historic Places in Mecklenburg County, North Carolina